Cumer Scott Green (born c. 1962) is an American businessman and academic administrator serving as the 19th president of the University of Idaho in Moscow. Green took office in July 2019, and has been characterized as a "non-traditional" choice for the role, as he has neither a doctorate nor a background in higher education.

Early life and education
Born in Moscow, Idaho, Green moved with his family to Boise in 1969, and graduated from Boise High School in 1980. He earned a bachelor's degree in accounting in 1984 from the University of Idaho in Moscow; he was a member of Kappa Sigma fraternity, and served as student body president. Green earned a Masters in Business Administration from Harvard Business School in 1989.

Career 
Green began his career at Boise Cascade, a manufacturer of forest products headquartered in Boise. After completing his MBA at Harvard, he worked for Deloitte, Goldman Sachs and ING Barings. Green served as CAO of Wiel Gotshal and Manges, executive director of Wilmer Cutler Pickering Hale and Dorr, and CEO of Pepper Hamilton. He served as global chief operating and financial officer of Hogan Lovells, a multinational law firm, in the New York City office.

In April 2019, the Idaho State Board of Education unanimously approved Green's appointment to the UI presidency, at an annual salary of  $420,000.

Personal life 
Green and his wife Gabriella have two adult children, Nicholas and Christina.

References

External links
University of Idaho: Office of the President – C. Scott Green 

Living people
Year of birth missing (living people)
University of Idaho alumni
Harvard Business School alumni
Presidents of the University of Idaho
People from Boise, Idaho
People from Moscow, Idaho